

Carl-Erik Koehler (3 December 1895 – 8 December 1958) was a German general during World War II. He was a recipient of the Knight's Cross of the Iron Cross of Nazi Germany.

Koehler was the grandson of Captain Hubert Dilger, a German-born artillery officer who served with Battery I, 1st Ohio Light Artillery and was awarded the Medal of Honor for distinguished service at Chancellorsville, VA on May 2, 1863.

Awards and decorations

 Knight's Cross of the Iron Cross on 4 May 1944 as Generalleutnant and commander of 306. Infanterie-Division

References

Citations

Bibliography

 

1895 births
1958 deaths
Military personnel from Mannheim
German Army generals of World War II
Generals of Cavalry (Wehrmacht)
German Army personnel of World War I
Recipients of the clasp to the Iron Cross, 1st class
Recipients of the Gold German Cross
Recipients of the Knight's Cross of the Iron Cross
German prisoners of war in World War II
People from the Grand Duchy of Baden